JS Haguro (DDG-180) is a  second guided missile destroyer in the Japan Maritime Self-Defense Force (JMSDF).
She was named after Mount Haguro, one of Three Mountains of Dewa in Yamagata Prefecture.

Operational History
Haguro participated in the 2022 Pacific Dragon exercise.  On 16 November 2022, the guided-missile destroyer  fired an SM-3 Block IIA missile, successfully intercepting the target outside the atmosphere in the first launch of the missile from a Japanese warship. On 18 November 2022, the  likewise fired an SM-3 Block IB missile with a successful hit outside the atmosphere. Both test firings were conducted at the Pacific Missile Range Facility on Kauai Island, Hawaii, in cooperation with the U.S. Navy and U.S. Missile Defense Agency. This was the first time the two ships conducted SM-3 firings in the same time period, and the testes validated the ballistic missile defense capabilities of Japan’s newest s.

References

Maya-class destroyers
Ships built by Japan Marine United
2019 ships